Schatten is the German word for shadow. Schatten may also refer to:

People 

 Gerald Schatten, a US stem cell researcher
 Robert Schatten, a Polish mathematician

Arts 

 Schatten – Eine nächtliche Halluzination, a German silent film